Haqmal Arya (born 3 February 1999) is an Afghan cricketer. He made his first-class debut for Mis Ainak Region in the 2017–18 Ahmad Shah Abdali 4-day Tournament on 7 November 2017.

References

External links
 

1999 births
Living people
Afghan cricketers
Mis Ainak Knights cricketers